Niafunké Airport  is an airport serving Niafunké, a town in the Niafunké Cercle in the Tombouctou Region of Mali.

References

 Great Circle Mapper - Niafunké
 Google Earth

Airports in Mali